Taren King (born 24 December 1996) is an Australian soccer player who plays for the Newcastle Jets.

Club career

King began her professional career at A-League Women's side Canberra United FC, who signed the young defender ahead of the 2017-18 season. King quickly impressed manager Heather Garriock as she contested for the team's starting centre-back position.

After making limited appearances for Canberra across three seasons, King joined the Newcastle Jets in 2020. In her first two seasons at the club, she established a strong partnership with Hannah Brewer at the heart of Newcastle's defence.

Personal life

King's younger brother Joel King is also a professional footballer who represents the Australian national team.

References

Australian soccer players
Sportswomen from New South Wales
Soccer players from New South Wales
People from Shellharbour

1996 births

Living people